Republic Plaza or Republic Building may refer to:

in Singapore
Republic Plaza (Singapore)

in Sri Lanka
Republic Building, Colombo

in the United States (by state)
Tribune-Republic Building, San Luis Obispo, California, listed on the National Register of Historic Places (NRHP) in San Luis Obispo County, California
Republic Plaza (Denver), Colorado
Republic Building (Louisville, Kentucky), listed on the NRHP in downtown Louisville, Kentucky
Republic Iron and Steel Office Building, Youngstown, Ohio, listed on the NRHP in Mahoning County, Ohio
Republic National Bank, Dallas, Texas, NRHP-listed
Republic Building (Seattle) currently known as the Melbourne Tower
Republic Theater, Great Falls, South Carolina, listed on the NRHP in Chester County, South Carolina
Republic Building (Washington, D.C.)

See also
 Republic Square (disambiguation)
Republican Block, Springfield, Massachusetts, NRHP-listed